The Immediate Geographic Region of Barbacena is one of the 10 immediate geographic regions in the Intermediate Geographic Region of Barbacena, one of the 70 immediate geographic regions in the Brazilian state of Minas Gerais and one of the 509 of Brazil, created by the National Institute of Geography and Statistics (IBGE) in 2017.

Municipalities 
It comprises 14 municipalities:

 Alfredo Vasconcelos

 Alto Rio Doce
 Antônio Carlos

 Barbacena

 Barroso

 Cipotânea

 Desterro do Melo
 Dores de Campos

 Ibertioga

 Ressaquinha

 Santa Bárbara do Tugúrio
 Santa Rita de Ibitipoca
 Santana do Garambéu

 Senhora dos Remédios

Statistics 
Population: 236 918 (July 1, 2017 estimation).

Area: 3 929,628 km2.

Population density: 60,3/km2.

References 

Geography of Minas Gerais